BC Tauragė is a professional basketball team based in Tauragė, Lithuania and currently competes in National Basketball League.

Club achievements 
 2016-2017 season: RKL 1st place

Team roster

External links 

Tauragė
Tauragė
Basketball teams established in 2010
2010 establishments in Lithuania
National Basketball League (Lithuania) teams